The American Monetary Institute is a non-profit charitable trust established by Stephen Zarlenga in 1996 for the "independent study of monetary history, theory and reform."

Aims
The institute is dedicated to monetary reform and advocates taking control of the monetary system out of the hands of banks and placing it into the hands of the US Treasury. Zarlenga argues that this would mean money would be issued by government interest free and spent into circulation to promote the general welfare, and that substantial expenditures on infrastructure, including human infrastructure (education and health care) would become the predominant method of putting new money into circulation.

See also
Committee on Monetary and Economic Reform (Canada)
Chartalism
Monetary reform
Money creation
Chicago plan

References

External links
 American Monetary Institute website

Monetary policy of the United States
Non-profit organizations based in New York (state)
1996 establishments in the United States
Monetary reformers